Oxytrita is a monotypic moth genus of the family Noctuidae described by Warren in 1913. Its only species, Oxytrita bipars, was first described by George Hampson in 1907. It is found in Khasis and Kanara, both in what was then British India.

References

Acontiinae
Monotypic moth genera